"Cotton Eye Joe" is a song by Swedish Eurodance group Rednex, released in August 1994 as the first single from their debut studio album, Sex & Violins (1995). Based on the traditional American folk song "Cotton-Eyed Joe", it combines the group's style with traditional American instruments such as banjos and fiddles. The vocal verses are performed by Annika Ljungberg, while the "Cotton Eye Joe" chorus is sung by Göran Danielsson, who never appears in the music video for the song. It was a number one hit in at least eleven countries, and reached number 25 on the Billboard Hot 100 and number 23 on the Cash Box Top 100 in the US. In 2002, "Cotton Eye Joe" was remixed in a new dance version, and was released on Rednex's first greatest hits album, The Best of the West (2002).

Composition
"Cotton Eye Joe" is based on the old traditional country folk song "Cotton Eyed Joe" and opens with the chorus sung by the male singer. Almost a minute into the song, the female singer performs the first of two vocal verses. It has a tempo of 132 BPM and runs 3 minutes and 14 seconds long with an A key and a minor mode, and a time signature of 4 beats per bar. In the 2002 book, Move Your Body (2 The 90s): Unlimited Eurodance, writer Juha Soininen states that the song "broke the euro mould by letting a man sing the refrain while a woman sang the middle part."

Chart performance
The Rednex version of the song (using "Eye" instead of "Eyed"), along with a dance-mix version, was very successful in Europe, where it remained at number-one in Norway for 15 weeks, Switzerland for 13 weeks, Germany for 10 weeks, Sweden for 8 weeks, Austria for 7 weeks, and for 3 weeks on the UK Singles Chart. In the latter, the single reached the top spot in its fifth week on the chart, on 8 January 1995. Additionally, it also peaked at number-one in Belgium, Denmark, Finland, the Netherlands and Scotland, as well as on the Eurochart Hot 100. In Ireland, it peaked at number two in January 1995. In Oceania, it topped the New Zealand Singles Chart for 6 consecutive weeks. In Australia it peaked at number eight in April 1995. In the US, it peaked in April/May 1995 at number 25 on the Billboard Hot 100 and number 23 on the Cash Box Top 100. 

"Cotton Eye Joe" was awarded with a gold record in Australia, the Netherlands and the US. It also received a platinum record in Austria, New Zealand, Sweden, Switzerland and the UK, and a 2× platinum record in Germany and Norway.

Critical reception
Bill Lamb from About.com said, "What happens when you combine folk, techno, and bluegrass music? It goes something like this hit". Johnny Loftus from AllMusic deemed it a "backwater Euro-dance novelty". Larry Flick from Billboard described it as "country hoedown fiddling sewn into a raucous pop/rave dance beat", noting that the song has "cheeky rap poking stereotypical fun at Southerners". J.D. Considine from The Daily Gazette called it "the piece de resistance, a track so infernally catchy that you almost don't notice how screamingly funny it is." Jim Farber from Daily News complimented the band for managing "to crack the pop singles chart at a time when even country stars who sell millions of albums can't make hay on the pop song list." David Browne from Entertainment Weekly commented, "For sheer audaciousness, it’s not surprising that the record is garnering such attention. Where else can you hear a barn-dance staple gone techno, complete with dance-diva wailing and manic banjos and fiddles?" Tom Ewing of Freaky Trigger said that "Cotton Eye Joe” work "on that basic, energetic, ass-moving level", adding that "the hollering diva interludes actually change things up a little, though that decades-old hook is solid enough to stand on its own." Dave Sholin from the Gavin Report noted that "this group from Sweden puts a techno spin on a square dance staple", stating that its "fresh, unique approach makes 'Cotton Eye Joe' so hot." 

A reviewer from Knoxville News Sentinel described it as "techno-hoedown". In his weekly UK chart commentary, James Masterton deemed it "a massive party smash no matter where you are". Howard Cohen from The Miami Herald wrote that "every decade has its novelty song", adding that "it deserves credit for its gumption, at least." Pan-European magazine Music & Media said "it takes three to set a trend: the Grid's 'Swamp Thing', the Two Cowboys's 'Everybody Gonfi-Gon' and Bravado's 'Harmonica Man'. Rednex are the next modern barn dance act." A reviewer from Music Week gave it five out of five, describing it as "Europop meets country in an irritatingly catchy tune", that is "guaranteed to pack the dance floors at party time and a cast iron cert of a hit." John Kilgo from The Network Forty complimented "Cotton Eye Joe" as a "outright winner", stating that "this novelty track is not only catchy and fun, but uptempo as well." Neil Spencer from The Observer viewed it as "an initially amusing joke". James Hamilton from the RM Dance Update declared it a "happily galloping Swedish disco hoedown with square dance caller, fiddle and banjo". Chuck Campbell from Scripps Howard News Service felt it "has the same novelty appeal" as "I'm Too Sexy", "but in addition to the aggressive dance rhythm and offbeat vocals, the Rednex song also features an impossibly high-voiced woman and manic fiddle and banjo."

Music video
The accompanying music video for "Cotton Eye Joe" was directed by Swedish director Stefan Berg. It won the prize for the best Swedish dance video at the 1995 Swedish Dance Music Awards. The video features the band performing in a barn during a hoedown where the guests did activities such as dancing, playing and splashing in old wild west baths, and riding a mechanical bull. Several signs can be seen in the barn, with inscriptions like "Horses outside", "No bath!" and "No sex allowed". The video ends with a short fast motion clip of a girl riding the mechanical bull. Göran Danielsson, who sings the "Cotton Eye Joe" chorus, never appears in the video. It received heavy rotation on MTV Europe and was A-listed on Germany's VIVA. In the US, the video generated massive reaction on its first week on The Box. "Cotton Eye Joe" was later published on Rednex's official YouTube channel in August 2013, and had generated more than 196 million views as of December 2022.

Impact and legacy
MTV Dance placed "Cotton Eye Joe" at #51 in their list of "The 100 Biggest 90's Dance Anthems Of All Time" in November 2011. BuzzFeed listed the song at number 97 in their list of "The 101 Greatest Dance Songs Of the '90s" in 2017. Paste Magazine ranked the song number 17 in "The 60 Best Dancefloor Classics" list in 2017. ThoughtCo listed the song at number 92 in their list of "The Top 100 Best Party Songs of All Time" in 2018. 

2001 BDO World Champion John Walton uses this as his walk-on music. "Cotton Eye Joe" was frequently played for a segment called "Coin Quest" in the Adult Swim television series FishCenter Live. Jimmy Fallon sang a soft rock-style version of this song on his eponymous late-night talk show as part of the Musical Genre Challenge. In 2021, the Ontario Hockey League team the Guelph Storm stopped using the song during games after consultation with local groups alleging the song has racist origins.

The song is played back in the viral video "Evolution of dance".

Track listings

 Original CD
"Cotton Eye Joe" (original single version) – 3:14
"Cotton Eye Joe" (Madcow Mix) – 4:46
"Cotton Eye Joe" (Madcow Instrumental) – 4:46
"Cotton Eye Joe" (Overworked Mix) – 6:20
"Cotton Eye Joe" (Original Instrumental) – 3:08

 2002 CD
"Cotton Eye Joe 2002" – 3:33
"Cotton Eye Joe 2002" (Dance Nation Remix) – 7:32
"Cotton Eye Joe 2002" (Aquagen Remix) – 7:45
"Ride the Hurricane's Eye" (Winnetoons version) – 3:02
"Cotton Eye Joe 2002" (extended version) – 5:56

Charts

Weekly charts

Year-end charts

Decade-end charts

Sales and certifications

References

Rednex songs
1994 debut singles
1994 songs
1995 singles
2002 singles
Battery Records (dance) singles
Dutch Top 40 number-one singles
European Hot 100 Singles number-one singles
Jive Records singles
Music videos directed by Stefan Berg
Number-one singles in Belgium
Number-one singles in Denmark
Number-one singles in Finland
Number-one singles in Germany
Number-one singles in New Zealand
Number-one singles in Norway
Number-one singles in Scotland
Number-one singles in Sweden
Number-one singles in Switzerland
Songs written by Pat Reiniz
UK Singles Chart number-one singles
ZYX Music singles